Bletia purpurea, common name pine-pink or sharp-petaled bletia, is a species of orchid widespread across much of Latin America and the West Indies, and also found in Florida. They are terrestrial in swamps or sometimes found growing on logs or stumps above the high tide mark.

Bletia purpurea can reach a length of 180 cm (5 feet). It has ovoid (egg-shaped) pseudobulbs up to 4 cm (1.6 inches) in diameter. Leaves are linear or narrowly elliptic, up to 100 cm (40 inches) long. Flowers are pink, purple, or occasionally white, in racemes or panicles sometimes with as many as 80 flowers.

References

purpurea
Orchids of Florida
Orchids of Belize
Orchids of Mexico
Orchids of Central America
Flora of the Caribbean
Flora without expected TNC conservation status